Jane Winifred Steger (15 November 1882 - 16 March 1981), a.k.a. Bebe Zatoon was an Australian author and pioneer of South Australia who spent much of her life involved with the Afghan cameleers in Australia through her relationships with Ali Ackba Nuby and Karum Bux.

Biography 

Stegar was born 15 November 1882 in Lambeth, London and she is the daughter of house-painter Wilfred Isaac Oaten and Lousia Dennis. In 1891 father and daughter migrated to Australia and it is said that her mother, Louisa, walked off the ship before it sailed and never saw her daughter again.

Father and daughter settled in the Darling Downs in Queensland where they took up unprofitable land, that was infested with Prickly pears, and they experienced severe hardship. Due to their poverty Stegar started working at a young age as a nursemaid and, later, as a 'skivvy' (maid).

After falling pregnant to Charles Stegar, an itinerant shearer, at 16 the couple married on 7 December 1899 at the St John's Church of England in Dalby, Queensland. The couple had 4 children together before, after being threatened by her husband with a gun, she left him and their children and traveled to Western Queensland. Stegar worked as a barmaid for 7 years before meeting Ali Ackba Nuby when they were both working at Mungallala, Stegar at the hotel and Nuby running a general store in another, disused, hotel. Stegar called Nuby an 'Indian Hawker' and the two formed a romantic relationship and would go on to have 3 children together. During their relationship Stegar converted to Islam.

Throughout their time together the family lived a nomadic life and worked as camel-drivers in Central Australia, initially based in the South Australian towns of Marree and Oodnadatta. In both towns Stegar and her family lived in the Ghan Towns, established outside of the main settlements for Afghan cameleers. Stegar had a special place in the communities there as, pressed into unwilling service by Nuby, she assisted with the translation of consignment notes and bills of landing as many of the cameleers could not read English.

Around 1923 - 1924 Nuby died in a cholera outbreak in his home village when visiting India to help his family and, upon hearing the news, months after events and already struggling from the financial aspects of her husband's loss, Stegar was shocked to learn she had no claim to his estate as the two were never formally married. Stegar tried to find full-time work, preferably live-in, but all that she could find was work as a washerwoman and, to reduce expenses, she moved into a hostel but with no form of pension or benefits available she struggled significantly.

Finding this situation untenable Stegar finally allowed the unofficial Mullah of the Oodnadatta Mosque, who had offered to find her a husband that day that Nuby died, to find her a husband. Stegar married Karum Bux on 26 January 1925 at the mosque, a marriage that was never registered and that Stegar did not even attend the ceremony.

In 1927 the pair travelled to Mecca and, upon her return, she wrote a series of articles about the trip, under the pseudonym Bebe Zatoon. These articles, entitled 'Arabian Days; the Wanderings of Winifred the Washerwoman', ran in The Observer from 8 December 1928 to 2 February 1929. These articles drew a lot of attention, with many people wondering about the real identity of the author. Some of these articles were later included in One Thousand Roads to Mecca; a collection of travel writing.

Stegar separated from Bux in November, 1928, ending their marriage of convenience, after receiving an invitation to become governess to the family of King Amanullah Khan, the royal family of Afghanistan. However, by the time she arrived in India with her 3 children to Nuby, the king had been overthrown and she travelled with a medical team to the boarder and helped escort Queen Souriya back to Bombay. Following these adventures Stegar returned to South Australia where she continued to write (works listed below); she was a self-proclaimed 'compulsive writer'.

During World War II Stegar ran a mess for miners in Tennant Creek in the Northern Territory where she kept goats to provide milk and meat. After the war Stegar moved to Alice Springs where she managed a poultry farm. In 1952 Stegar saw her eldest son, who she had not seen since 1909, who came to Alice Springs to tell her that Charles Stegar, who had always refused to divorce her, had died.

In 1969 Stegar published her 'autobiography' Always Bells: Life with Ali. but quickly had to re-release it as a novel as it contained many inaccuracies, including claiming that she was born in China and raised in a convent.

She continued writing into her late 90s until, following a fall, her typewriter was taken away, and she died in the Adelaide suburb of Campbelltown on 16 March 1981.

She was just 9 months short of her 100th birthday which she had celebrated 3 years before, with much fanfare, including a message from Queen Elizabeth.

Works 
 Horrors of the Night Winifred the Washerwoman, 1935 short story
 Unto Us A Child Is Born Winifred the Washerwoman, 1935 column
 The Severest Test Winifred the Washerwoman, 1935 column
 Four Rings on her Fingers Winifred Steger, 1963 novel
 Jack's Jane : The Story of a Farmer's Wife who Goes On Strike Winifred Steger, 1965 novel
 The Door That Loved Winifred Steger, 1965 novel
 Always Bells : Life With Ali Winifred Steger, 1928 autobiography
 Sweet Wee Jimmy Jamesy Winifred Steger, 1972 short story
 Ere's One you Nebbe 'Ad Winifred Steger, 1974 short story
 Different Gods (from : 'The Magnolia Queen', An Unpublished Novel) Winifred Steger, 1977 extract novel
 Soap Bubbles Winifred Steger, 1981 short story

Works About 

 The Washerwoman's Dream by Hilarie Lindsay

References 

Australian writers
Australian women writers
1882 births
1981 deaths
19th-century Australian women
20th-century Australian women
British emigrants to Australia